Very-long-chain (3R)-3-hydroxyacyl-CoA dehydratase (PHS1 (gene), PAS2 (gene)) is an enzyme with systematic name very-long-chain (3R)-3-hydroxyacyl-CoA hydro-lyase. This enzyme catalyses the following chemical reaction

 a very-long-chain (3R)-3-hydroxyacyl-CoA  a very-long-chain trans-2,3-dehydroacyl-CoA + H2O

This is the third component of the elongase.

References

External links 
 

EC 4.2.1